Essence of Ellington (subtitled Live in Milano) is a double live album by bassist and composer William Parker's Orchestra, which was recorded in Italy in 2012 and released on the Centering label. The album features new arrangements of songs written by or associated with Duke Ellington in addition to new songs by Parker.

Reception

AllMusic awarded the album 4 stars. The All About Jazz review noted "Parker has delivered a unique take on the Ellington repertoire which pulls off the trick of being both stridently modern and affectionately reverent". JazzTimes noted "You know that an orchestra organized by William Parker to pay tribute to Duke Ellington is going to result in something sprawling and stupendous, and Essence of Ellington doesn’t disappoint".

Track listing
All compositions by William Parker except as indicated

Disc One:  
 Introduction by William Parker – 3:12 
 "Portrait of Louisiana" – 20:15
 "Essence of Sophisticated Lady / Sophisticated Lady" (Parker / Duke Ellington) – 26:38
 "Take the Coltrane" (Ellington) – 21:09 
Disc Two: 
 "In a Sentimental Mood" (Ellington) – 7:28
 "Take the "A" Train / Ebony Interlude" (Billy Strayhorn / Parker) – 16:35
 "Caravan" (Juan Tizol) – 23:16
 "The Essence of Ellington" – 14:13

Personnel
William Parker – bass
Kidd Jordan – tenor saxophone
Ras Moshe – tenor saxophone, soprano saxophone
Rob Brown, Darius Jones – alto saxophone
Sabir Mateen – tenor saxophone, clarinet
Dave Sewelson – baritone saxophone
Roy Campbell, Jr.- trumpet, flugelhorn
Matt Lavelle – trumpet
Steve Swell, Willie Applewhite – trombone
Dave Burrell – piano
Hamid Drake – drums
Ernie Odoom – vocals

References

2012 live albums
AUM Fidelity live albums
William Parker (musician) live albums